The S3 service of the S-Bahn Rhein-Main system bearing the KBS (German scheduled railway route) number 645.3

Lines

Limes Railway

Homburg Railway

City tunnel 

The city tunnel is an underground, pure S-Bahn route used by almost all services (except for the S7 service which terminates at the central station).

Main-Neckar Railway

History 

The S3 was one of the first six services of the Rhine-Main S-Bahn system. In a prior test operation it ran between Frankfurt-Höchst and Frankfurt Central Station. The service was then called R3 where the letter "R" stands for regional. After the opening of the Frankfurt Citytunnel the service was renamed to S3 and extended to the new Hauptwache underground station. Further extensions of the tunnel followed in 1983 (Konstablerwache) and 1990 (Ostendstraße and Lokalbahnhof) so that the Südbahnhof (South station) became the service's eastern terminal.

Operation 

 Bad Soden – Darmstadt Hbf
 Frankfurt Hbf – Darmstadt Hbf
 Bad Soden – Langen (Sundays only)

External links 

 traffiQ Frankfurt – S3/S4 timetable

Rhine-Main S-Bahn